The Manipur Premier League, (also known as Manipur State League), has been organised since 2006 by the All Manipur Football Association under the Vision India program with guidance from the AFC and the AIFF. It is the highest state-level football competition in the state of Manipur.

History
The league is a 17-team affair which is usually played on a home-and-away format over a period of several months. NISA from Thangmeiband have won MSL four times, and Tiddim Road Athletic Union won two times.

League structure

Teams

Prize money
Prize money for 10th Manipur State League:

Roll of honours

Winners

Player awards

Top scorer

Best player

Fair play trophy

See also
All Manipur Football Association
Churachand Singh Trophy

References

External links
 Club schedules

 
1973 establishments in Manipur
4
Football in Manipur